Da'Rick Jamal Rogers (born June 18, 1991) is a former American football wide receiver. He played college football at Tennessee and Tennessee Tech, and signed with the Buffalo Bills as an undrafted free agent in 2013.

Early years
Rogers was born in Atlanta, Georgia.  He initially attended Darlington School in Rome, Georgia, before transferring to Calhoun High School after his sophomore year. During his junior year, he had 66 receptions for 1,300 yards and 11 touchdowns, helping lead Calhoun to the Class AA finals.  As a senior, he had 84 receptions and 22 touchdowns, and set a single-season state record with 1,647 receiving yards, again helping Calhoun reach the state finals.  Following his senior season, Rogers was named to MaxPreps.com's Small Schools All-American Team, as well as Georgia's "All-Decade Team" for the 2000s.

Rogers was ranked as the second best wide receiver recruit, and the ninth best overall recruit, by Rivals.com in 2010, and was labelled a 5-star recruit by both Rivals and Scout. He originally committed to the Georgia Bulldogs, but in February 2010 switched his commitment to the Tennessee Volunteers, where he joined Calhoun teammate Nash Nance.  In the days following his decommitment, Rogers engaged in a war of words on Twitter with Georgia safety Bacarri Rambo.

College career
As a true freshman in 2010, Rogers played in all 13 games for the Tennessee Volunteers. He finished the season with 11 receptions for 167 yards and two touchdowns. He also had 117 rushing yards on 16 attempts, and returned 12 kickoffs for 298 yards. As a sophomore in 2011, he started all 12 games, and led the SEC in  both receptions (67) and receiving yards (1,040). He was second in the conference in touchdowns with 9. At the end of the season, he was named a first-team All-SEC selection.   On August 23, 2012, it was announced that Da'Rick Rogers had been suspended from the Tennessee Volunteers indefinitely for a violation of team rules, though no specific reason was publicly announced.  Rogers subsequently admitted to failing three drug tests while at Tennessee.

After his suspension at Tennessee, Rogers transferred to Tennessee Tech.  On September 22, 2012, Rogers caught 18 passes for 303 yards in Tennessee Tech's loss to Southeast Missouri State, setting single-game school records for receptions and receiving yards.  In his lone season at Tennessee Tech, he caught 61 passes for 893 yards and 10 touchdowns.  He also passed 10 drug tests.  Following the 2012 season, Rogers was awarded the "Elite Wide Receiver Award" by the College Football Performance Awards for his efforts in the 2011 and 2012 seasons.

Professional career

Pre-draft
On December 14, 2012, Tennessee Tech announced that Rogers would forgo his senior year and enter the NFL Draft.

At the 2013 NFL Combine, Rogers turned out one of the best overall performances, finishing in the top five in several categories, including the 3 cone drill, the 20-yard shuttle, the 60-yard shuttle, the vertical jump, and the broad jump.

Buffalo Bills
Rogers went undrafted in the 2013 NFL Draft. He signed a free agent contract with the Buffalo Bills hours after the draft.  On May 10, 2013, Rogers participated in his first day of Rookie Minicamp with the Bills.

Rogers was released on August 26, 2013.

Indianapolis Colts
Rogers signed with the Indianapolis Colts practice squad on September 2, 2013. He was promoted to the active roster on September 19, 2013, but was waived just a few days later on September 24, and re-signed to the practice squad on September 25. He was again called up to the Colts' active roster on November 11, 2013. Rogers made his NFL debut on December 1, versus the Tennessee Titans, playing 13 snaps but was not targeted for a pass. On December 8, in a road game against the Cincinnati Bengals, he recorded 6 catches for 107 yards and 2 touchdowns.

Rogers was released from the Colts on September 29, 2014 after it was announced he had been arrested for driving under the influence (DUI).

Kansas City Chiefs
Rogers signed a reserve/future contract with the Kansas City Chiefs on January 7, 2015. He was released on June 16, 2015.

Toronto Argonauts
Rogers signed with the Toronto Argonauts on April 11, 2016.

Career statistics

References

External links
 
 Tennessee Volunteers bio 

1991 births
Living people
American football wide receivers
Canadian football wide receivers
American players of Canadian football
Buffalo Bills players
Indianapolis Colts players
Toronto Argonauts players
Tennessee Volunteers football players
Tennessee Tech Golden Eagles football players
Players of American football from Georgia (U.S. state)
People from Calhoun, Georgia
Darlington School alumni
Calhoun High School alumni